Agelastica is a genus of beetles in the family Chrysomelidae. It has two members, Agelastica alni and Agelastica coerulea.

References

Galerucinae
Taxa named by Louis Alexandre Auguste Chevrolat
Chrysomelidae genera